Amenu is a Ghanaian surname. Notable people with the surname include:

 D. C. K. Amenu, Ghanaian military officer
 Francis Amenu, Ghanaian engineer

See also
 Amena (disambiguation)
 Ameni (disambiguation)

Ghanaian surnames